The Mahindra Gio is a mini truck produced by the Indian vehicle manufacturer Mahindra from 2009 to 2015.

Overview
The Gio went on sale in October 2009 with a starting price of ₹1.65 lakh. At the time of its launch, it was described as the Tata Nano of its kind. The Gio was discontinued in June 2015, having been replaced by the Mahindra Jeeto.

References

Gio
Trucks of India
Cars introduced in 2009
2010s cars